James Adams (1737 – 7 December 1802) was an English Jesuit and philologist.

Life
Adams joined the English Jesuits in exile at their novitiate of Watten (France), on 7 September 1756. Afterwards Adams taught belles-lettres at the English College of St. Omer. Having exercised his functions as a missionary for many years, he retired to Dublin, August, 1802, and died there in the following month of December.

Works
Adams was the author of the following works.

Early Rules for Taking a Likeness. with plates, London, 1792; translated from Bonamici.
Oratio Academica Anglice et Latine. London, 1793.
Euphonologia Linguae Anglicanae, Latine et Gallice, London, 1794; for which he received the thanks of the Royal Society.
Rule Britannia, or the Flattery of Free Subjects Expounded; to which is added an Academical Discourse. London, 1798.
A Sermon preached at the Catholic Chapel of St. Patrick, Sutton-street, on Wednesday, March 7, the Day of Public Fast. London, 1798.
The Pronunciation of the English Language Vindicated. Edinburgh 1799.

References

1737 births
1802 deaths
English Roman Catholic missionaries
18th-century English Jesuits
19th-century English Jesuits
English philologists
English non-fiction writers
Clergy from Bury St Edmunds
English male non-fiction writers
18th-century English non-fiction writers
18th-century English male writers
18th-century English writers
British expatriates in France
Jesuit missionaries
Missionary linguists